Sardine is a former rural locality in the Barcaldine Region, Queensland, Australia.

On 22 November 2019 the Queensland Government decided to amalgamate the localities in the Barcaldine Region, resulting in five expanded localities based on the larger towns: Alpha, Aramac, Barcaldine, Jericho and Muttaburra. The eastern part of Sardine was incorporated into Aramac, while the western part was incorporated into Muttaburra.

Geography 
The Muttaburra Aramac Road forms part of the northern boundary of the locality and then passes through the locality to the east, then forming part of the north-east boundary. The Crossmoor Road passes through the locality from the north-west (Muttaburra) to the south-west (Longreach).

The Thomson River forms the western boundary of the locality. Aramac Creek flows through the locality from the south-east (Ibis) to the south-west (Longreach), where it becomes a tributary of the Thomson River. Sardine Creek (after which the locality is presumably named) rises in the north of the locality and flows south to become a tributary of Aramac Creek. All the watercourses in the locality are part of the Lake Eyre drainage basin.

The principal land use is grazing.

Education 
There are no schools in Sardine. The nearest primary schools are in Aramac, Muttaburra and Ilfracombe. The nearest secondary schools are in Aramac (to Year 10 only), Barcaldine (to Year 12) and Longreach (to Year 12).

References 

Barcaldine Region
Unbounded localities in Queensland